Euplassa is a genus of flowering plants in the protea family. It is native to tropical South America, including Bolivia, Brazil, Colombia, Ecuador, French Guiana, Guyana, Peru, Suriname, and Venezuela.

Species
Species include:
Euplassa bahiensis (Meisn.) I.M.Johnst. 	
Euplassa cantareirae Sleumer  	
Euplassa chimantensis Steyerm.  	
Euplassa duquei Killip & Cuatrec.  	
Euplassa glaziovii (Mez) Steyerm.  	
Euplassa hoehnei Sleumer  	
Euplassa inaequalis (Pohl) Engl.  	
Euplassa incana (Klotzsch) I.M.Johnst.  	
Euplassa isernii Cuatrec. ex J.F.Macbr.  	
Euplassa itatiaiae Sleumer 	
Euplassa legalis (Vell.) I.M.Johnst.  	
Euplassa madeirae Sleumer 	
Euplassa nebularis Rambo & Sleumer  	
Euplassa occidentalis I.M.Johnst.  	
Euplassa organensis (Gardner) I.M.Johnst. 
Euplassa pinnata (Lam.) I.M.Johnst.  	
Euplassa rufa (Loes.) Sleumer  
Euplassa saxicola (R.E.Schult.) Steyerm.  
Euplassa semicostata Plana  
Euplassa taubertiana K.Schum.

References

 
Proteaceae genera
Flora of South America
Taxonomy articles created by Polbot